Direct therapeutic exposure (DTE) is a behavior therapy technique pioneered by Patrick A. Boudewyns, where stressors are vividly and safely confronted to help combat veterans, and patients with posttraumatic stress disorder (PTSD), panic disorder, or phobias. Exposure therapy has supporting evidence with both simple and complex traumas. A similar therapy is Eye Movement Desensitization and Reprocessing (EMDR).  First known publication in book form is Flooding and Implosive Therapy: Direct Therapeutic Exposure in Clinical Practice by Patrick A. Boudewyns, Robert H. Shipley.  1983. .

It is not uncommon to combine DTE treatment with other therapies.

Use

Direct exposure has been used with a variety of populations including agoraphobia and chronic PTSD It involves as the name applies placing the client either real or imaginally in the feared situation.

See also
Other techniques for treating PTSD:
 Cognitive behavior therapy
 Emotionally focused therapy
 Expressive therapy
 Family therapy
 Outward Bound
 Prolonged exposure therapy
 Psychodynamic psychotherapy

References

Further reading
 Boudewyns, P.A. & Hyer, L. (1990). "Physiological Response to Combat Memories and Preliminary Treatment Outcome in Vietnam Veteran PTSD patients treated with Direct Therapeutic Exposure." Behavior Therapy, 21, 63–87.

External links 
 A Review of Alternative Approaches to the Treatment of Post Traumatic Sequelae

Anxiety disorder treatment
Counseling
Traumatology